Thepthai Senapong (nickname: Kuk; RTGS: คึก Khuek)  is a Thai Democrat Party politician who former representative Nakhon Si Thammarat in the House of Representatives. He graduated from  Faculty of Law, Ramkhamhaeng University, and a master's degree from National Institute of Development Administration (NIDA).

He is Thai Hainanese Chinese descent and Tunisian descent from his grandfather. While being a student at Ramkhamhaeng University, Senaphong used to be an unlicensed taxi driver for  unearned income.

He became the first MP from the 2005 general election and has since been MP since 2005.

In 2009 he previously served as private spokesman for Thai Prime Minister Abhisit Vejjajiva.

Between 2012–2014 and some of the mid-2016 he was a TV presenter for politics talk show Sai Lor Fah (สายล่อฟ้า; lit: "lightning rod"), a TV program on BLUESKY Channel (currently Fahwonmai) on Mondays to Fridays at 07:00 to 8:00 p.m. with fellow politicians the same party are Sirichok Sopha and Chavanont Intarakomalyasut.

He served as deputy secretary-general of the Democrat Party between 2013–2018. In the election on March 24, 2019, he was a candidate for election in Nakhon Si Thammarat (constituency three: Phra Phrom, Chaloem Phra Kiat, Chulabhorn, Cha-uat). Senapong was elected, but in early 2021 was impeached by a resolution of the Constitutional Court for election fraud.

References

External links
Official twitter

1961 births
Living people
Thepthai Senapong
Thepthai Senapong
Thepthai Senapong
Thepthai Senapong
Thepthai Senapong
Thepthai Senapong